The Australian Film Television and Radio School (AFTRS) formerly Australian Film and Television School, is Australia's national screen arts and broadcast school. The school is a Commonwealth Government statutory authority.

History
Established in 1972 as the Australian Film and Television School, as part of the Commonwealth Government's strategy to promote the development of Australia's cultural activity, AFTRS was opened to students in 1973, with the first intake of 12 students including directors Gillian Armstrong, Phillip Noyce and Chris Noonan.

In 1973 Jerzy Toeplitz was appointed Foundation Director of the School and after six years in the role was awarded the Order of Australia and the AFI's Longford Lyell Award.

In 1975 Gough Whitlam helped to create funding agencies to support the film school.

Campus
For many years AFTRS was located in purpose-built premises at North Ryde, Sydney. In 2008 the school relocated to a purpose-built facility adjacent to Fox Studios, located inside the Entertainment Quarter in Moore Park, Sydney.

AFTRS is the only screen and broadcast school in the world to cater for all of the specialisations under the one roof. The campus includes: a full-size 5.1 sound theatre (seats 126), state-of-the-art mix theatre, two large professional film and television studios, film studios, state-of-the-art sound recording studios, and a host of other facilities and equipment.

Also located on campus is the Jerzy Toeplitz Library.

Courses and admission
Admission into AFTRS degree courses is competitive and based on merit selection. Places are limited.  offerings include:
Master of Arts Screen in 10 disciplines (full-time)
Master of Arts Screen: Business and Leadership (full-time)
Graduate Diploma in Radio and Podcasting (full-time or part-time)
Undergraduate degree: Bachelor of Arts Screen: Production (full-time)

Governance 

As a statutory body, AFTRS is governed by the Australian Film, Television and Radio School Act 1973 with its Council responsible to the Minister for the Arts, representing the Federal Parliament. There are nine members of the Council:

 three appointed by the Governor-General of Australia;

 three members appointed from convocation by the Council;

 the Chief Executive Officer;

 one staff member elected by staff annually; and

 one student member elected by students annually. 

, Russel Howcroft is chair of the council, while the CEO is Nell Greenwood.

The school is a member of ARTS8: the Australian Roundtable for Arts Training Excellence, a group of arts training organisations funded by the federal government.

AFTRS International VR Award
Amanda Duthie, Adelaide Film Festival artistic Director and virtual reality champion, along with Google Creative Technologist Mathew Tizard and AFTRS Head of Documentary Rachel Landers, sat on the jury for the inaugural AFTRS International VR Award in 2017.  Nothing Happens, by Michelle and Uri Kranot, won the award, while The Other Dakar by Selly Raby, based on Senegalese mythology, received a Special Mention. The Unknown Patient, by Australian director Michael Beets won the award in 2018.

Academy Award success

 four AFTRS student films had been nominated for Academy Awards:  

'Inja' (2000), directed by Steve Pasvolsky, produced by Joanne Weatherstone

'Birthday Boy' (2003), directed by Sejong Park, produced by Andrew Gregory

'The Saviour', directed by Peter Templeman, produced by Stuart Parkyn

'Emily' Student Academy Award (2010),  directed by Ben Mathews, produced by Simon Moore

Six AFTRS Alumni are winners of the Academy Awards®:
Jane Campion: Best Original Screenplay,'The Piano' 
Andrew Lesnie: Best Achievement in Cinematography,'The Lord of the Rings' 
Dion Beebe: Best Achievement in Cinematography,'Memoirs of a Geisha' 
Margaret Sixel: Best Film Editing, 'Mad Max: Fury Road' 
David White: Best Sound Editing, 'Mad Max: Fury Road' 
Peter Grace: Best Sound Mixing, 'Hacksaw Ridge'  

Five AFTRS alumni were nominated for the Academy Awards®:
Dion Beebe: Best Achievement in Cinematography,'Chicago' 
Jane Campion: Best Director, 'The Power of the Dog' 
Chris Noonan: Best Director, 'Babe' 
Pip Karmel Best Editing, 'Shine' 
Tony McNamara: Best Original Screenplay, 'The Favourite'

Alumni

The entire list of AFTRS graduates by year, from 1973 to now, can be viewed on the School's website.

Directing
Mario Andreacchio
Gillian Armstrong
Jane Campion
Alister Grierson
Rolf de Heer
Daniel Krige
Jocelyn Moorhouse
Chris Noonan
Phillip Noyce
Rachel Perkins
Alex Proyas
Michael James Rowland
Ivan Sen
Cate Shortland
Kriv Stenders
Warwick Thornton
Rowan Woods
Producing
Peter Rees

Screenwriting
Billy Marshall Stoneking
Tony McNamara
Justin Davis

Cinematography
Andrew Lesnie
Dion Beebe

Editing
Pip Karmel
Margaret Sixel

Composing
Amanda Brown
Benjamin Speed
Matteo Zingales
Antony Partos
Caitlin Yeo

Design
Felicity Abbott
Melinda Doring

Radio
Stuart Bocking
Reuben Mourad
Jason Morrison
Chris Page
Kent Small
Simon Marnie
David Spears

Notes

External links
  

Film Television and Radio School
Performing arts education in Australia
Commonwealth Government agencies of Australia
Film schools in Australia
Philip Cox buildings
Educational institutions established in 1973
1973 establishments in Australia
Buildings and structures in Sydney